Kvohst (born Mathew Joseph McNerney in 1978) is a British singer, guitarist, songwriter and producer.

Life and music career 
Kvohst was born and grew up in Wimbledon, London. He has lived in numerous places including Norway and The Netherlands first he moved to Oslo then moved to Karasjok in Lapland, and currently resides in Tampere, Finland. He is the guitarist, singer, and songwriter for the band Hexvessel and the lead singer of Grave Pleasures which was formerly known as Beastmilk. McNerney is the former lead vocalist of the Norwegian band Dødheimsgard, and Code.

1990s 
McNerney started his musical career at the age of 12 singing in a based out of his high school band called Vomitorium. In 1993, Vomitorium released a demo titled Haurium Oscula De Te. The band changed their name to later The Tragedians, and released one demo cassette in 1995 entitled Krull.

2000s
In 2002, McNerney went on to form the UK band Void (as Ionman) when they released Posthuman album on Samoth from Emperor's Nocturnal Art label. In the same year in association with Aort, McNerney Co-founded Code and released their first demo in 2002 titled Neurotransmissions: Amplified Thought Chemistry. In 2005, Code signed to Spikefarm Records for Nouveau Gloaming release.
Joining Dødheimsgard from Norway in 2004, he wrote lyrics and performed vocals on the album Supervillain Outcast released in 2007 by Moonfog Productions.

In 2008, McNerney has written lyrics for the Norwegian band Virus for their albums The Black Flux and The Agent That Shapes The Desert. In 2009, McNerney nominated for a Norwegian Grammy Award or Spellemannprisen with Code for their album Resplendent Grotesque.

In 2010, McNerney and Johan Snell founded Beastmilk in Helsinki, Finland, the band name changed later to Grave Pleasures in 2013 after Johan leaving and the band split.

In 2012 Hexvessel were nominated for Emma-gaala Award  "Finnish Grammy", and nominated for the best underground act at Metal Hammer Golden Gods Awards in 2013.

In 2016 Hexvessel were nominated for Prog Magazine "Anthem" award for "Transparent Eyeball" from When We Are Death, 2016.

Discography

With Vomitorium
Hauriam Oscula De Te Cassette Demo (1994)

With The Tragedians
Krull Cassette Demo (1995)

With Void
Posthuman (2002)

With Code
Nouveau Gloaming (2005)
Resplendent Grotesque  (2009)

With Dødheimsgard
Supervillain Outcast (2007)

With Decrepit Spectre
Coal Black Hearses (2009)

With Gangrenator
Tales From a Thousand Graves (2010)

With Beastmilk
White Stains On Black Tape (2010)
Use Your Deluge (2011)
Climax (2013)

With Grave Pleasures
Dreamcrash (2015)
Motherblood (2017)

With Hexvessel
Dawnbearer (2011)
Vainolainen (2011)
No Holier Temple (2012)
When We Are Death (2016)
All Tree (2019)

With Carpenter Brut
Leather Teeth (2018)

with The Deathtrip
Demon Solar Totem (2019)

with Rope Sect
Prison of You (2020)
Flood Flower (2020)

References

External links 
 
 

1978 births
Living people
21st-century British singers
People from Wimbledon, London
21st-century guitarists
Black metal singers
Singers from London